Glutathione amide-dependent peroxidase is an enzyme with systematic name glutathione amide:hydrogen-peroxide oxidoreductase. This enzyme catalyses the following chemical reaction

 2 glutathione amide + H2O2    glutathione amide disulfide + 2 H2O

This enzyme from the proteobacterium Marichromatium gracile is a chimeric protein. It contains a peroxiredoxin-like N-terminus and a glutaredoxin-like C terminus.

References

External links 
 

EC 1.11.1